Köprü is the Turkish word for "bridge." It may refer to:

 Bridges in Turkey
 An Ottoman-era name for the city of Veles, today in the Republic of North Macedonia
 Vezirköprü, a district in Turkey
 Uzunköprü, a district and town in Turkey
 Köprü Dam, a dam in Turkey
 Köprüçay River, a river in Turkey

See also
 Köprülü (disambiguation)
 Köprülü family